Rhapsa is a genus of moths of the family Noctuidae. The genus was erected by Francis Walker in 1866.

Species
 Rhapsa eretmophora Turner, 1932
 Rhapsa occidentalis Turner, 1944
 Rhapsa scotosialis Walker, 1866
 Rhapsa suscitatalis Walker, 1859

References

Calpinae
Moth genera